Daburji  is a village in Kapurthala district of Punjab State, India. The village is administrated by a Sarpanch Pastor Teji, who is an elected representative.

Demography 
According to the report published by Census India in 2011, Daburji has a total number of 173 houses and population of 921 of which include 468 males and 453 females. Literacy rate of Daburji is 84.41%, higher than state average of 75.84%.  The population of children under the age of 6 years is 87 which is  9.45% of total population of Daburji, and child sex ratio is approximately  933, higher than state average of 846.

Caste  
The village has schedule caste (SC) constitutes 51.00% of total population of the village and it doesn't have any Schedule Tribe (ST) population.

Population data

Air travel connectivity 
The closest airport to the village is Sri Guru Ram Dass Jee International Airport.

Villages in Kapurthala

External links
  Villages in Kapurthala
 Kapurthala Villages List

References

Villages in Kapurthala district